Vardja is a village in Viljandi Parish, Viljandi County in Estonia.

Vardja is the birthplace of statesman and military general Johan Laidoner (1884–1953).

References

Villages in Viljandi County